Nguyễn Tiến Sâm (born 1946 in Hanoi – died 2019) was a Mikoyan-Gurevich MiG-21 pilot of the Vietnamese People's Air Force, he flew with the 921st fighter regiment from 1968-72 and the 927th fighter regiment from 1972-75, and tied for fourth place amongst Vietnam War fighter aces with six kills.

Five of his six kills, all F-4 Phantom II fighters, are known for certain:
 5 July 1972, a USAF F-4E (serial number 67-0296, 34th TFS/388th TFW, pilot Spencer, WSO Seek, POWs);
 24 July 1972, a USAF F-4E (serial number 66-0369, 421st TFS/388th TFW, pilot Hodnett, WSO Fallert, both rescued);
 29 July 1972, a USAF F-4E (serial number 66-0367, 4th TFS/388th TFW, pilot Kula, WSO Matsui, POWs);
 12 September 1972, a USAF F-4E (serial number 69-7266, 335th TFS/4th TFW, pilot McMurray, WSO Zuberbuhler, POWs);
 5 October 1972, a USAF F-4D (serial number 66-9838, 335th TFS/4th TFW, pilot Lewis, WSO Alpers, POWs).

See also
List of Vietnam War flying aces

References

Bibliography

North Vietnamese military personnel of the Vietnam War
North Vietnamese Vietnam War flying aces
1946 births
2019 deaths